Ridgeview High School may refer to:

Ridgeview High School (Bakersfield, California), Bakersfield, California
Ridgeview High School (Magalia, California), Magalia, California
Ridgeview High School (Florida), Orange Park, Florida
Ridgeview High School (Illinois), Colfax, Illinois
Ridgeview High School (Redmond, Oregon)
Ridgeview High School (Clintwood, Virginia), formed in the 2015-2016 school year by merger of Clintwood High School and Haysi High School

See also
Ridge View High School, Columbia, South Carolina
Ridge View Secondary College, Baldivis, Western Australia